Serhiy Shevtsov (born 31 December 1975) is a Ukrainian professional football coach and a former player.

Personal life
His son Illya Shevtsov is an Ukrainian footballer of Desna Chernihiv, currently on loan to Charlotte Independence in USL League One, the second league, becoming the first Ukrainian player to move to the United States.

References

External links
 

1975 births
Sportspeople from Kherson
Living people
Ukrainian footballers
Association football forwards
FC Krystal Kherson players
SC Kakhovka players
Olimpia Zambrów players
FC Dnipro players
FC Dnipro-2 Dnipropetrovsk players
FC Dnipro-3 Dnipropetrovsk players
Dyskobolia Grodzisk Wielkopolski players
FC Vorskla Poltava players
FC Vorskla-2 Poltava players
SC Tavriya Simferopol players
FC Hoverla Uzhhorod players
Ukrainian Premier League players
Ukrainian football managers
FC Krystal Kherson managers
FC Krymteplytsia Molodizhne managers